Primorsko-Akhtarsky District is an administrative district (raion), one of the thirty-eight in Krasnodar Krai, Russia. As a municipal division, it is incorporated as Primorsko-Akhtarsky Municipal District. It is located in the west of the krai. Its administrative center is the town of Primorsko-Akhtarsk. Population:  The population of Primorsko-Akhtarsk accounts for 53.5% of the district's total population.

References

Notes

Sources

Districts of Krasnodar Krai